Acmaeodera alpina is a species of metallic wood-boring beetle in the family Buprestidae. It is found in North America, specifically in the western United States. Its adult host is Leptodactylon pungens. This species is more often collected and found on granite and bare soil than on flowers.

References

Further reading

 
 
 

alpina
Articles created by Qbugbot
Beetles described in 1972